The Cape Melville Lighthouse is a historic lighthouse located in the island of Balabac, the southernmost point of the province of Palawan in the Philippines. It is also the southwest corner of the archipelago. The first-order light was constructed by the Spaniards to light Balabac Strait, the treacherous body of water that separates the Philippines from the neighboring country of Malaysia.

The light is displayed from a 90-ft tall (27.4 m) granite tower, located on a hill 1.5 miles northwestward of the tip of Cape Melville, for a total elevation of 297 ft (90.5m) above sea level. The station was built by the Spanish Government as part of their extensive lighting plan for the archipelago.  The lighthouse of Cape Melville was first lit on August 30, 1892.

Lighthouses in the Philippines are maintained by the Philippine Coast Guard.

Current condition 
The Spanish lighthouse is no longer in service and a white aluminum prefabricated tower with modern solar-powered light was erected near the grounds of the old tower by the Philippine Coast Guard.  Because the station is still manned, the original lights and lenses are still intact except for a central glass pane which was stolen by vandals.  The tower still retains its original clockwork but is inoperative.

National Historical Landmark 
The lighthouse (or Minarit) located at Barangay Melville in Balabac Island, Palawan was declared as a National Historical Landmark by the National Historical Commission of the Philippines.

See also 

 List of lighthouses in the Philippines

References

External links 
 
 Maritime Safety Services Command
 Light Stations of Southern Tagalog at the Philippine Coast Guard Website.
 Picture of the current Cape Melville lighthouse

Lighthouses completed in 1892
Lighthouses in the Philippines
Buildings and structures in Palawan
Spanish colonial infrastructure in the Philippines
National Historical Landmarks of the Philippines